Işıl Alaş (born 19 February 2006) is a Turkish rhythmic gymnast, member of the national group.

Career 
In 2020 Işıl debuted at the 2020 European Championships in Kyiv as a junior gymnast, competing with ball and clubs and finishing 17th and 24th.

After becoming a senior in 2022 Işıl entered the national group and competed at the 2021 Islamic Solidarity Games in Konya where the group won bronze with 3 ribbons and 2 balls. In September Alaş took part in the World Championships in Sofia along Yeliz Gunes, Nehir Serap Özdemir, Melisa Sert, Duru Duygu Usta, and the individual Kamelya Tuncel, taking 21st place in the All-Around, 17th with 5 hoops and 27th with 3 ribbons + 2 balls.

References 

2006 births
Turkish rhythmic gymnasts
Living people
Sportspeople from Antalya
21st-century Turkish sportswomen